The 2019 PGA Tour Champions season was the 40th in which PGA Tour Champions, a golf tour for men age 50 and over, has operated. The tour officially began in 1980 as the Senior PGA Tour.

Tournament results
The following table shows the official money events for the 2019 season. "Date" is the ending date of the tournament. The numbers in parentheses after the winners' names are the number of wins they will have on the tour up to and including that event. Senior majors are shown in bold.

^ – unofficial event

Leaders
Scoring average leaders

Source:

Money List leaders

Source:

Career Money List leaders

Source:

Awards

See also
PGA Tour Champions awards
PGA Tour Champions records
2019 European Senior Tour

References

PGA Tour Champions seasons
PGA Tour Champions